Margaret Brock may refer to.

, a sailing vessel wrecked in 1852 off the coast of South Australia
Margaret Brock Reef, a reef in South Australia, named after the ship

See also
Margaret Susan Brock